WiFi Sensing (also referred to as WLAN Sensing) uses existing Wi-Fi signals to detect events or changes such as motion, gesture recognition, and biometric measurement (e.g. breathing). WiFi Sensing is the combination of Wi-Fi and RADAR sensing technology working in tandem to enable usage of the same Wi-Fi transceiver hardware and RF spectrum for both communication and sensing.

The applications of WiFi Sensing are broad. Wi-Fi may operate in multiple frequency bands, each providing a unique range of possible use cases dependent on the physical electro-magnetic propagation properties, approved power levels, and allocated bandwidth. There are three major applications: Detection (binary classification), Recognition (multi-class classification), and Estimation (quantity values of size, length, angle, distance, etc.).

Combining communication and sensing within mobile networking technology is a large area of exploration, and is sometimes referred to as Joint Communications and radar/radio Sensing (JCAS). Combining the two technologies can leverage existing hardware and infrastructure, enable new services, and provide a higher level of interaction with networked devices (e.g. IoT and automation).

Technical 
In comparison with RADAR technology, such as Frequency-modulated continuous-wave radar, WiFi Sensing may use its physical layer (PHY) for both environment measurements as well as digital communication. Wi-Fi benefits from having a well-defined Medium access control (MAC) layer entity which is specified in the 802.11 standard. Having a MAC layer present in a RADAR system makes coordination and sharing of air-time resource usage between multiple devices possible. Additionally, it allows for the exchange of information between multiple devices.

WiFi Sensing systems require more complex algorithms compared to traditional RADAR systems. With traditional RADAR systems, the PHY layer components produce waveforms designed so minimal processing is required to extract the desired physical measurements from the sensor. For example, in an FMCW system designed to sense target range, the PHY layer components output a signal with a frequency proportional to the reflection echo from a target. By employing a Fast-Fourier-Transform algorithm on the output, all the targets visible by the sensor may be extracted, and simple linear mapping of frequency to target range can be performed.

With WiFi Sensing, the PHY layer components and signals have been designed for communications. Sensing must make use of the signals transmitted by digital communication systems, which are typically orthogonal frequency-division multiplexing (OFDM) based.

History 
The initial building blocks required for WiFi Sensing were incorporated into the first OFDM Wi-Fi standard titled 802.11a, published in 1999. While not originally intended for sensing, the 802.11a PHY layer defined waveform components to be added to the transmission preamble. The receiver could then estimate the channel to perform equalization and other DSP techniques to improve the performance of the remaining data reception. These waveform components are referred to as the Long Training Symbols.

September 29, 2020 the IEEE Standards Association approved project IEEE 802.11bf for WLAN Sensing. Its purpose was to establish standards for the interoperability of wireless devices and enable a wide range of WiFi Sensing applications.

Academic 
Much of the early academic research on WiFi Sensing was based on large Software-Defined-Radio (SDR) hardware, such as the Ettus Research USRP. SDR provided flexibility to perform custom operations which were previously impossible due to the close natured implementations of off-the-shelf Wi-Fi hardware. The requirement of a high-end SDR made it difficult for it to be commercialized as a product. Later efforts from the research community led to tools for extracting Channel State Information (CSI) measurements from commodity 802.11n NICs.

In October 2019, The Wireless Broadband Alliance (WBA) published the first industry whitepaper on WiFi Sensing. Led by Cognitive Systems Corp., Intel, and Centre for Development of Telematics (C-DOT), the paper was the result of a year-long collaboration between Wi-Fi technology developers and service providers. An analysis of the existing Wi-Fi standards identified gaps, opening areas for new potential enhancements. The paper explores early WiFi Sensing applications, including motion detection, gesture recognition, and biometric measurement. Potential business opportunities within the home security, health care, enterprise, and building automation/management markets were also identified.

Commercialization 
In 2015, the first fully-integrated SDR on a single chip, known as the R10 (Radio10), was introduced by Cognitive Systems Corp. Its initial purpose was spectrum monitoring for cellular, Wi-Fi, and other Land-Mobile-Radio (LMR) services using a radio-frequency (RF) camera system to observe RF signals and their parameters from a pre-defined field of view. The chip had five custom CPU cores, four wireless receivers, and highly configurable dual multi-vector processors, giving the R10 chip significant capabilities in detecting and processing wireless signals in real-time. Once in production, Cognitive Systems Corp. focused on using the R10 to monitor the most prevalent spectrum, Wi-Fi signals, for motion detection. To further develop the signal processing algorithms, a major subset of the Wi-Fi MAC/PHY stack was implemented on the R10.

The first consumer product using WiFi Sensing technology was Aura WiFi Motion, which utilized the R10 chip. This commercial product was distributed by Cognitive Systems Corp. through Amazon from December 2017 to January 2019. In October 2019, Cognitive Systems Corp. began licensing its software stack as WiFi Motion to service providers. At the 2020 Consumer Electronics Show (CES), Plume Design, Inc. announced Motion Aware powered by WiFi Motion, a new addition to its intelligent services platform for modern smart homes. Motion Aware was first commercially available on February 29, 2020, with the release of Plume Design, Inc.'s second-generation SuperPods and HomePass subscriber services

References

Wi-Fi